Indophantes is a genus of Asian dwarf spiders that was first described by Michael I. Saaristo & A. V. Tanasevitch in 2003.

Species
 it contains twelve species, found in China, India, Indonesia, Nepal, and Pakistan:
Indophantes agamus Tanasevitch & Saaristo, 2006 – Nepal
Indophantes barat Saaristo & Tanasevitch, 2003 – Indonesia (Sumatra)
Indophantes bengalensis Saaristo & Tanasevitch, 2003 – India
Indophantes digitulus (Thaler, 1987) – India, Nepal, Pakistan
Indophantes halonatus (Li & Zhu, 1995) – China
Indophantes kalimantanus Saaristo & Tanasevitch, 2003 (type) – Borneo
Indophantes kinabalu Saaristo & Tanasevitch, 2003 – Borneo
Indophantes lehtineni Saaristo & Tanasevitch, 2003 – Borneo
Indophantes pallidus Saaristo & Tanasevitch, 2003 – India
Indophantes ramosus Tanasevitch, 2006 – China
Indophantes sumatera Saaristo & Tanasevitch, 2003 – Indonesia (Sumatra)
Indophantes tonglu Tanasevitch, 2011 – India

See also
 List of Linyphiidae species (I–P)

References

Araneomorphae genera
Linyphiidae
Spiders of Asia